One Love is the seventh studio album by American R&B group New Edition, released on November 9, 2004 by Bad Boy and Universal Records. By April 2005, the album sold 244,000 copies.

Background

By 2002, New Edition were performing as the quintet of Ralph Tresvant, Ricky Bell, Ronnie DeVoe, Michael Bivins and Johnny Gill, but they hadn't recorded a new studio album since 1996's Home Again.  After having successfully fought to get out of their long-term contract with MCA Records (in which they eventually won back all their masters from the albums they recorded for that label), the re-energized group signed with Bad Boy Records the same year. However, it took nearly two years for the album to be released, as the group struggled with Sean Combs, Bad Boy CEO, over creative control.  The album, titled One Love, was finally released in November 2004.

Critical reception

Rob Theakston from Allmusic found that "Diddy's production house has the magic touch and comes up with another winner of a record, One Love [...] The production is focused, mature, and fitting for a group with the members nearing their forties, even when the lyrics aren't [...] All in all, it's a cohesive statement and another victory for a group with such a publicly documented and tumultuous career. It's also another jewel in the crown for Bad Boy, but here's hoping Diddy gets the guys back in the studio immediately. Seven years between New Edition records is far too long and is inexcusable." PopMatters editor Mark Harris wrote that "the end result is that youngsters today will likely view this album as just another generic pop/hip-hop/R&B Bad Boy release – along the lines of 112 – and those old enough to remember New Edition may see it as a too-hip bastardization of the group's original sound. If they do dismiss it, though, they'll be missing out on a gratifying journey down memory lane. Misplaced hip-hop swagger aside, old fans and newcomers alike should find plenty to "love."

Commercial performance
Early buzz and hype over the new album led to One Love debuting at number twelve on the Billboard 200 and number five on the Billboard's Top R&B/Hip-Hop Albums chart.  The group, however, wasn't pleased when "Hot 2Nite" (which they felt didn't cater to their maturing audience) was chosen as the album's first single.  The song peaked at an underwhelming number thirty five on Billboard's R&B singles chart, and number eighty-seven on the Billboard Hot 100.  The underwhelming public reception of the album and its first single led to there being no more being released, while label promotion for the album also stalled. Angered over Bad Boy's poor promotion of the album, the group asked to be let go of their contract. The request was granted in November 2005.  Despite One Loves failure to live up to commercial expectations, it was certified gold. After the stint with Bad Boy, original member Bobby Brown officially returned to the group making the group a sixtet again. All 6 members have been touring together as New Edition  since 2005.

Track listingNotes'
  denotes co-producer

Charts

References

External links

2004 albums
New Edition albums
Bad Boy Records albums
Albums produced by Dre & Vidal
Albums produced by Jimmy Jam and Terry Lewis
Albums produced by Ryan Leslie
Albums produced by Sean Combs